Mount Ellsworth is an 8,235-foot (2,510 m) elevation summit located in Garfield County, Utah, United States. Mount Ellsworth is part of the Henry Mountains. It is situated in a dry, rugged, and sparsely settled region west of Glen Canyon National Recreation Area, on primitive land administered by the Bureau of Land Management. Precipitation runoff from this mountain drains into tributaries of the nearby Colorado River, which here is Lake Powell eight miles to the east of this mountain.

History

The American geologist Grove Karl Gilbert surveyed this area in 1875 and 1876, and published his findings in 1879 as a monograph, The Geology of the Henry Mountains. The term laccolith was first applied as laccolite by Gilbert after his study of intrusions of diorite in the Henry Mountains. Mount Ellsworth's name appeared on an 1875 map, but the origin is a mystery. One possibility is Elmer E. Ellsworth, (1837–1861).  Gilbert did name nearby Mount Holmes, four miles to the northeast.

Climate
Spring and fall are the most favorable seasons to visit Mount Ellsworth. According to the Köppen climate classification system, it is located in a Cold semi-arid climate zone, which is defined by the coldest month having an average mean temperature below 32 °F (0 °C), and at least 50% of the total annual precipitation being received during the spring and summer.

Gallery

See also

 Colorado Plateau
 List of mountain peaks of Utah

References

External links
 Weather forecast: Mount Ellsworth

Mountains of Utah
Mountains of Garfield County, Utah
North American 2000 m summits